Indiana Jones and the Last Crusade is a 1989 film directed by Steven Spielberg.

Indiana Jones and the Last Crusade may also refer to:

 Indiana Jones and the Last Crusade (soundtrack), the soundtrack to the 1989 film
 Indiana Jones and the Last Crusade (video game), four games based on the film, including:
 Indiana Jones and the Last Crusade (1991 video game), for the NES
 Indiana Jones and the Last Crusade: The Action Game, 1989
 Indiana Jones and the Last Crusade: The Graphic Adventure, 1989

See also
 Indiana Jones (disambiguation)